The scarlet-breasted dacnis (Dacnis berlepschi) is a species of bird in the family Thraupidae.
It is found in Colombia and Ecuador.
Its natural habitat is subtropical or tropical moist lowland forests.
It is threatened by habitat loss.

References

Dacnis
Birds described in 1900
Taxonomy articles created by Polbot